Launch Complex 45 (LC-45) is a former launch complex on Cape Canaveral Space Force Station created to launch the Roland missile.  However, it was never used prior to its destruction, and Launch Complex 46 is now in its location.

References

Cape Canaveral Space Force Station
Launch complexes of the United States Space Force
Rocket launch sites in the United States